Sainte-Jeanne-d'Arc is a village in the Canadian province of Quebec, located within the regional county municipality of Maria-Chapdelaine. The village had a population of 1,089 in the Canada 2011 Census.

Demographics 

Population trend:
 Population in 2011: 1089 (2006 to 2011 population change: -4.4%)
 Population in 2006: 1139
 Population in 2001: 1128
 Population in 1996: 1158
 Population in 1991: 1113

Mother tongue:
 English as first language: 0%
 French as first language: 95.2%
 English and French as first language: 3.9%
 Other as first language: 0.9%

References

Villages in Quebec
Incorporated places in Saguenay–Lac-Saint-Jean
Maria-Chapdelaine Regional County Municipality